Aristelliger hechti, known commonly as Hecht's Caribbean gecko or the Caicos gecko, is a species of lizard in the family Sphaerodactylidae. The species is endemic to the Caicos Islands.

Etymology
The specific name, hechti, is in honor of American evolutionary biologist Max Knobler Hecht (1925–2002).

Geographic range
The holotype of A. hechti was collected on Little Ambergris Cay, Turks and Caicos Islands.

Reproduction
A. hechti is oviparous.

References

Further reading
Schwartz, Albert; Crombie, Ronald I. (1975). "A New Species of the Genus Aristelliger (Sauria: Gekkonidae) from the Caicos Islands". Proceedings of the Biological Society of Washington 88: 305–314. (Aristelliger hechti, new species).
Schwartz, Albert; Henderson, Robert W. (1991). Amphibians and Reptiles of the West Indies: Descriptions, Distributions, and Natural History. Gainesville, Florida: University of Florida Press. 720 pp. . (Aristelliger hechti, p. 362).

Aristelliger
Reptiles described in 1975